Vasuki Sunkavalli (born 17 August) is an Indian lawyer and model who was the I Am She – Miss Universe India 2011 Title Holder. She has represented India at the Miss Universe 2011 pageant held in São Paulo, Brazil on 12 September 2011, but failed to place in the semifinals. 
Sunkavalli was crowned I Am She – Miss Universe India on 15 July 2011 in Mumbai, India.

Law school and experience

In 2002, Sunkavalli enrolled at the Symbiosis International University in Pune, India for her Bachelors in Law degree. While in India, Sunkavalli did a series of internships at local law firms and at India's National Human Rights Committee.

In 2007, she moved to New Delhi to pursue a Diploma in Intellectual Property Rights from Global Institute of Intellectual Property. It was during this time that Sunkavalli was approached by members of the Indian fashion industry and she also started her modeling career.

In 2009, Sunkavalli enrolled at New York University School of Law as a recipient of the prestigious Dean's Scholarship to study International Law and Human Rights and graduated with an LLM degree. 
Upon graduating from NYU, she interned at the Human Rights Watch in NYC and went on to work as the Third Committee's Research Assistant at the United Nations’ Permanent Mission of India.

Modelling
In 2007, Sunkavalli made her entry into Indian fashion when she walked the ramp at Wills India Fashion Week. For the next two years, she had a prolific career as a model. She participated in various shows for many of India's top designers and modeled for brands based in Mumbai, New Delhi, Jaipur, and Kolkata. She was also part of the ad campaigns of Nike, Kit Kat, and World Gold Council.

I Am She Miss Universe India
On 15 July 2011, Sunkavalli was crowned I Am She – Miss Universe India 2011 in Mumbai. The pageant consisted of 20 contestants from various parts of India. 
Sunkavalli also represented India at the Miss Universe 2011 pageant in São Paulo, Brazil.

Miss Universe 2011
On 12 September 2011, 88 women from countries across the globe participated with Sunkavalli, who represented India at the Miss Universe 2011, held in São Paulo, Brazil. She went unplaced. She also failed to compete in National Costume Round as her dress was stuck at the Brazil customs for two weeks.

Post Miss Universe 2011
Sunkavalli was selected as one of the few Miss Universe 2011 contestants along with Haiti, Ireland, Jamaica to visit Haiti Island as a good will ambassador to raise charitable funds.

Sunkavalli has also starred in several movies and shows, including A Billion Colour Story and Thinkistan.

References

External links
Official I Am She – Miss Universe India website
https://web.archive.org/web/20110902044113/http://barandbench.com/brief/2/1609/beautiful-lawyer-symbi-nyu-llm-grad-crowned-miss-india-universe-2011
Feeling Hot Hot Hot: From NYU LLM Student to Beauty Queen
 
 

Living people
Telugu people
Female models from Hyderabad, India
Miss Universe 2011 contestants
Indian beauty pageant winners
Year of birth missing (living people)